Stone Lake is in Stone Lake State Park, a California State Park, located in Sacramento County, California. The open space property protects two rare natural Central Valley lakes and their surrounding riparian habitat and grassland areas.

The County of Sacramento operates Stone Lake.

External links 
Official Stone Lake State Park site

State parks of California
Lakes of Sacramento County, California
Lakes of California
Parks in the San Joaquin Valley
Parks in Sacramento County, California